The European section of the 2022 FIFA World Cup qualification acted as qualifiers for the 2022 FIFA World Cup, to be held in Qatar, for national teams that are members of the Union of European Football Associations (UEFA). A total of 13 slots in the final tournament were available for UEFA teams.

Entrants
All 55 FIFA-affiliated national teams from UEFA entered qualification.

Status of Russia
On 9 December 2019, the World Anti-Doping Agency initially handed Russia a four-year ban from all major international sporting events, after RUSADA was found non-compliant for handing over manipulated lab data to investigators. However, the Russia national team could still enter qualification, as the ban only applies to the World Cup proper as a world championship. The WADA ruling allowed athletes who were not involved in doping or the coverup to compete, but prohibited the use of the Russian flag and anthem at major international sporting events. An appeal to the Court of Arbitration for Sport was filed, but WADA's decision was upheld though reduced to a two-year ban. The CAS ruling also allowed the name "Russia" to be displayed on uniforms if the words "Neutral Athlete" or "Neutral Team" have equal prominence. If Russia had qualified for the tournament, its players would not have been able to use their country's name alone, flag or anthem at the World Cup, as a result of the nation's two-year ban from world championships and Olympic Games in all sports.

On 27 February 2022, after the threat of boycotts by the Czech Republic, Poland and Sweden amid the Russian invasion of Ukraine, FIFA prohibited the Russia national football team from playing home matches in Russia; the team would have to play matches behind closed doors at neutral sites. In addition, the team would have been prohibited from competing under the name, flag, or national anthem of Russia, and had to compete under the name "Football Union of Russia" (RFU). On 28 February, however, in accordance with a recommendation by the International Olympic Committee (IOC), FIFA suspended the participation of Russia. Poland were subsequently given a walkover for their play-off semi-final match scheduled against Russia. The Russian Football Union announced they would appeal the decision to the Court of Arbitration for Sport. Their request for a temporary lift of the ban was rejected on 18 March.

Format
The qualification format was confirmed by the UEFA Executive Committee during their meeting in Nyon, Switzerland, on 4 December 2019. The qualification would depend, in part, on results from the 2020–21 UEFA Nations League, although to a lesser degree than the 2018–19 UEFA Nations League had on qualification for UEFA Euro 2020. The structure maintained UEFA's usual 'group stage/playoff stage' structure, with only the specific format of the play-offs amended.
 Group stage: Five groups of five teams and five groups of six teams. Group winners qualified for the World Cup finals.
 Play-off stage: 12 teams (ten group runners-up and two best Nations League group winners, based on the Nations League overall ranking, that finished outside the top two of their qualifying group) were drawn into three play-off paths, playing two rounds of single-match playoffs (semi-finals with the seeded teams to host, followed by finals, with the home teams to be drawn). The three path winners qualified for the World Cup finals.

On 4 December 2019, the UEFA Executive Committee initially approved the use of the video assistant referee system for the qualifiers. However, VAR was not implemented at the start of qualification due to the impact of the COVID-19 pandemic on operational and logistical capabilities. On 5 August 2021, UEFA announced that the VAR system would be used for the remainder of qualification, starting from September 2021.

Schedule
Below is the schedule of the European qualifiers for the 2022 FIFA World Cup.

In March 2020, UEFA announced that the two matchdays planned to take place in June 2021 would be moved following the rescheduling of UEFA Euro 2020 to June and July 2021 due to the COVID-19 pandemic. To allow for the completion of the qualifying group stage in November 2021 as scheduled, UEFA announced on 24 September 2020 that the March and September 2021 windows in the FIFA International Match Calendar were expanded from two to three matchdays. The changes to the International Match Calendar for March and September 2021, which extended each window by one day, were approved by the FIFA Council on 4 December 2020.

The original schedule of the qualifying group stage, as planned before the pandemic, was as follows.

First round

Seeding
The draw for the first round (group stage) was held in Zürich, Switzerland, on 7 December 2020, 18:00 CET (UTC+1). However, due to the COVID-19 pandemic, the draw occurred as a virtual event without any representatives of member associations present. It was originally planned to be held on 29 November 2020. On 18 June 2020, the UEFA Executive Committee approved the draw regulations for the qualifying group stage. The draw was presented by Spanish journalist Cristina Gullón and conducted by FIFA's acting director of competitions, Jaime Yarza. He was assisted by former footballers Daniele De Rossi and Rafael van der Vaart, who drew the balls from the pots.

The 55 teams were seeded into six pots based on the November 2020 FIFA World Rankings, after the conclusion of the league phase of the 2020–21 UEFA Nations League. Pots 1 to 5 contained ten teams, while Pot 6 contained five teams. The teams were drawn into ten groups: five groups of five teams (Groups A–E) and five groups of six teams (Groups F–J). The draw started with Pot 1 and completed with Pot 6, from where a team was drawn and assigned to the first available group in alphabetical order. Therefore, each six-team group contains one team from each of the six pots, while each five-team group contains one team from each of the first five pots.

The following restrictions were applied with computer assistance:
Nations League finalists: The four teams participating in the 2021 UEFA Nations League Finals (Belgium, France, Italy and Spain) were guaranteed to be drawn into groups with only five teams (Groups A–E). A group could contain a maximum of one Nations League finalist (this condition was in fact fulfilled automatically, since all four teams were in the same pot).
Prohibited clashes: For political reasons, matches between following pairs of teams were considered prohibited clashes, unable to be drawn into the same group: (Kosovo—Bosnia and Herzegovina, Kosovo–Serbia, Kosovo–Russia, Russia–Ukraine. Additionally, Armenia–Azerbaijan and Gibraltar–Spain were identified as prohibited clashes, but the teams in the former pair were in the same pot for the draw, while the teams in the latter pair were restricted to different-sized groups based on draw pots and conditions.)
Winter venues: A maximum of two teams whose venues are identified as having high or medium risk of severe winter conditions could be placed in each group: Belarus, Estonia, Faroe Islands, Finland, Iceland, Latvia, Lithuania, Norway, Russia, Ukraine.
The two "hard winter venues" (Faroe Islands and Iceland) generally cannot host games in March or November, and therefore could not be drawn together; the others shall play as few home matches as possible in March and November.
Excessive travel: A maximum of one pair of teams identified with excessive travel distance in relation to other countries could be placed in each group:
Azerbaijan: with Iceland, Gibraltar, Portugal.
Iceland: with Armenia, Cyprus, Georgia, Israel.
Kazakhstan: with England, France, Gibraltar, Iceland, Malta, Northern Ireland, Portugal, Republic of Ireland, Scotland, Spain, Wales. (Andorra and Faroe Islands were also identified with Kazakhstan for excessive travel distance, but the teams were in the same pot for the draw.)

Teams were allocated to seeding pots as follows (November 2020 FIFA Rankings shown in second column; the national teams which qualified for the final tournament are presented in bold; the national teams which took part in the play-offs are presented in italic).

Summary

Groups
The fixture list was confirmed by UEFA on 8 December 2020, the day following the draw. Qatar were partnered with the five-team Group A, which enabled the 2022 FIFA World Cup hosts to play centralised friendlies against these countries on their "spare" match dates. However, these friendlies did not count in the qualifying group standings.

Group A

Group B

Group C

Group D

Group E

Group F

Group G

Group H

Group I

Group J

Second round

The second round (play-offs) was contested by the ten group runners-up and the best two Nations League group winners, based on the Nations League overall ranking, who finished outside the top two of their qualifying group. They were separated into three play-off paths, with each path featuring two single-leg semi-finals and one single-leg final. The semi-finals were hosted by the six best-ranked runners-up of the qualifying group stage, while the host of the final was determined by a draw. The semi-finals were played on 24 March and 1 June, and the finals on 29 March and 5 June 2022. The winners of each path qualified for the World Cup.

Team selection and seeding

Second-placed teams
The ten runners-up from the first round advanced to the play-offs. Based on the results from the qualifying group stage, the six best-ranked teams were seeded, while the bottom four were unseeded in the semi-final draw.

Nations League group winners
The best two Nations League group winners that finished outside the top two of their qualifying group advanced to the play-offs and were unseeded in the semi-final draw.

Draw

Path A

Path B

Path C

Qualified teams

The following 13 teams from UEFA qualified for the final tournament.

1 Bold indicates champions for that year. Italic indicates hosts for that year.
2 Competed as West Germany. A separate team for East Germany also participated in qualifications during this time, having only qualified in 1974.
3 From 1930 to 1998, Serbia competed as Yugoslavia, while in 2006 as Serbia and Montenegro.

Top goalscorers

Below are full goalscorer lists for all groups and the play-off rounds:

Group A
Group B
Group C
Group D
Group E
Group F
Group G
Group H
Group I
Group J
Play-offs

Notes

References

External links

European 2022 FIFA World Cup qualification, FIFA.com
European Qualifiers, UEFA.com

 
Uefa
2022
2020–21 in UEFA football
2021–22 in UEFA football
March 2021 sports events in Europe
September 2021 sports events in Europe
October 2021 sports events in Europe
November 2021 sports events in Europe
March 2022 sports events in Europe
FIFA
Sports events affected by the 2022 Russian invasion of Ukraine